Arietites is a genus of massive, giant evolute, psiloceratacean ammonites in the family Arietitidae in which whorls are subquadrate and transversely ribbed and low keels in triplicate, separated by a pair of longitudinal grooves, run along the venter. Fossils are known world wide from the lower Sinemurian stage of the Lower Jurassic. Safari Ltd made an Arietites bucklandi figurine in 2014.

Similar genera include Megarietites in which the keels are reduced and Epammonites  in which the ribs are more closely spaced.

Species
 Arietites ablongaris
 Arietites alcinoe Reynès, 1879
 Arietites anastreptoptychus Franz Wähner, 1891 (possibly a synonym of Paracaloceras subsalinarium; Wähner)
 Arietites bisulcatus
 Arietites bonnardii Alcide Dessalines d’Orbigny, 1879
 Arietites brookei
 Arietites bucklandi George Brettingham Sowerby, 1816
 Arietites crossi
 Arietites gaudryi Reynès
 Arietites geometricus Albert Oppe, 1856
 Arietites hettangiensis
 Arietites isis
 Arietites longicellus Friedrich August Quenstedt, 1858
 Arietites meigeni, (possibly a synonym of Leptechioceras meigeni)
 Arietites meridionalis Reynès
 Arietites obesulus J. F. Blake, 1876
 Arietites obtusus
 Arietites pinguis
 Arietites planaries Reynès, 1879
 Arietites quadratus E. Donovan, 1952
 Arietites radiatus C. T. Simpson, 1843
 Arietites retroversicostatus Canavari
 Arietites rotiformis Sowerby
 Arietites scunthorpense
 Arietites semicostatus A. T. Young & Bird, 1828
 Arietites spiratissimus
 Arietites subsalinarius Wähner, 1891, (possibly a synonym of Paracaloceras subsalinarium; Wähner)
 Arietites tenellus C. T. Simpson, 1855
 Arietites turneri
 Arieties westfalicus Lange (possibly a synonym of Coroniceras westfalicum Lange, 1925)
 Arietites wichmanni August Rothpletz, 1892

Note:  Arietites  now only represents a purely morphological term. A revision of the genus is still pending, its representatives are therefore initially classified as  Coroniceras (Arietites)  under  Coroniceras .

References

Further reading 
 Arkell, et al. 1957. Mesozoic Ammonoidea. Treatise on Invertebrate Paleontology. Geological Soc. of America and Univ. of Kansas Press.

Jurassic ammonites
Ammonites of Asia
Ammonites of Europe
Ammonites of North America
Sinemurian life
Sinemurian genus first appearances
Ammonitida genera
Arietitidae